In mathematics, an interprime is the average of two consecutive odd primes. For example, 9 is an interprime because it is the average of 7 and 11. The first interprimes are:
4, 6, 9, 12, 15, 18, 21, 26, 30, 34, 39, 42, 45, 50, 56, 60, 64, 69, 72, 76, 81, 86, 93, 99, ... 
Interprimes cannot be prime themselves (otherwise the primes would not have been consecutive).

There are infinitely many primes and therefore also infinitely many interprimes. The largest known interprime  may be the 388342-digit n = 2996863034895 · 21290000, where n + 1 is the largest known twin prime.

See also
 Prime gap
 Twin primes
 Cousin prime
 Sexy prime
 Balanced prime – a prime number with equal-sized prime gaps above and below it

References

Integer sequences
Prime numbers